Fire ant is the common name for several species of ants.

Fire ant may also refer to:

Species
 Red imported fire ant
 Black imported fire ant
 Southern fire ant
 Electric ant, also known as "little fire ant"

Other
 Orange Cassidy, a wrestler who performed as "Fire Ant" in the Chikara wrestling promotion
 The Fire Ants, a 1990s supergroup signed to Dekema Records
 "Fire Ant" (Space Ghost Coast to Coast), a television episode